Pyotr Yakovlevich Ufimtsev (sometimes also Petr) (born 1931 in Ust-Charyshskaya Pristan, West Siberian Krai, now Altai Krai) is a Soviet/Russian physicist and mathematician, considered the seminal force behind modern stealth aircraft technology. In the 1960s he began developing equations for predicting the reflection of electromagnetic waves from simple two-dimensional and three-dimensional objects.

Much of Ufimtsev's work was translated into English, and in the 1970s American Lockheed  engineers began to expand upon some of his theories to create the concept of aircraft with reduced radar signatures.

Biography
Ufimtsev was born into a peasant family in the village of Ust-Charysh Pristan (N 52.40, E 83.66), in the Altai region, of the RSFSR of the former USSR. At the age of three his father was repressed by the regime and later died in a gulag. In 1949 Ufimtsev finished school and entered the physics-math department at Almaty State University (now in Kazakhstan). Because of progressing myopia (nearsightedness) he had to move in 1952 from Almaty to a specialized clinic, the Filatov Eye Institute, in Odessa, Ukrainian SSR. The same year he continued his studies at Odessa State University. After graduating from university in 1954 he was selected to work at the Central Research Radio Engineering Institute [ЦНИРТИ] of the Defense Ministry of USSR in Moscow, where he specialized in electronic warfare.

The father of stealth
While working in Moscow, Ufimtsev became interested in describing the reflection of electromagnetic waves. He gained permission to publish his research results internationally because they were considered to be of no significant military or economic value.

A stealth engineer at Lockheed, Denys Overholser, had read the publication and realized that Ufimtsev had created the mathematical theory and tools to do finite analysis of radar reflection. This discovery inspired and had a role in the design of the first true stealth aircraft, the Lockheed F-117.  Northrop also used Ufimtsev's work to program super computers to predict the radar reflection of the B-2 bomber.

In the 1960s Ufimtsev began developing a high-frequency asymptotic theory for predicting the scattering of electromagnetic waves from two-dimensional and three-dimensional objects. Among such objects were the finite size bodies of revolution (disk, finite cylinder with flat bases, finite cone, finite paraboloid, spherical segment, finite thin wire). This theory is now well known as the Physical Theory of Diffraction (PTD).

The first results of PTD were collected in the book: P.Ya. Ufimtsev, Method of Edge Waves in the Physical Theory of Diffraction, Soviet Radio, Moscow, 1962. In 1971 this book was translated into English with the same title by U.S. Air Force, Foreign Technology Division (National Air and Space Intelligence Center), Wright-Patterson AFB, OH, 1971. Technical Report AD 733203, Defense Technical Information Center of USA, Alexandria VA.  This theory played a critical role in the design of American stealth aircraft F-117 and B-2.

See also the Forewords written by K. Mitzner to the books:
 Ufimtsev, P.Ya. Theory of Edge Diffraction in Electromagnetics, Tech Science Press, Encino, California, 2003.
 Ufimtsev, P.Ya. Fundamentals of the Physical Theory of Diffraction, Wiley & Sons, Inc., Hoboken,  New Jersey, 1st Edition 2007 and 2nd Edition 2014.

In these two books, P.Ya. Ufimtsev presented the further development and application of PTD and its validation by mathematical theory. In particular, a new version of PTD, based on the concept of elementary edge waves, is presented in his book Fundamentals of the Physical Theory of Diffraction (2007, 2014). With appropriate modifications, PTD can be employed for the solution to many practical problems. Among them are the design of microwave antennas, mobile radio communication, construction of acoustic barriers to decrease a noise level, evaluation of radar cross sections for large objects (tanks, ships, missiles, etc.).

Dr. Ufimtsev has been affiliated with a number of research and academic institutions, including the Institute of Radio Engineering and Electronics of the USSR Academy of Sciences (Moscow), Moscow Aviation Institute, the University of California (Los Angeles, Irvine) and most recently, the Moscow State University (Russia, 2007) and the Siena University (Italy, 2008). Currently he is a retiree and a consultant in the field of electromagnetics.  Among his honors and awards are the USSR State Prize and the Leroy Randle Grumman Medal.

Ufimtsev joined the faculty of the University of California, Los Angeles (UCLA) as a visiting professor of electrical engineering in September 1990.

Books
P. Ya. Ufimtsev, Theory of Edge Diffraction in Electromagnetics, 1st edition Tech Science Press, Encino, California, 2003. , 2nd edition SciTech Publishing, Inc. Raleigh, NC, USA, 2009.  
P. Ya. Ufimtsev, Fundamentals of the Physical Theory of Diffraction, Wiley & Sons, Inc., Hoboken, New Jersey, 1st edition 2007. ; 2nd edition 2014, 
P. Ya. Ufimtsev, Method of Edge Waves in the Physical Theory of Diffraction, Soviet Radio, Moscow, 1962

References

3. P.Ya. Ufimtsev, The 50-Year Anniversary of the PTD: Comments on the PTD’s Origin and Development" published in the journal IEEE Antennas & Propagation Magazine, vol. 55, no.3, pp. 18-28, June 2013".

External links
 Page at Center for Aerospace Research and Education at Cal Irvine

1931 births
Living people
People from Ust-Pristansky District
Soviet physicists
Soviet mathematicians
University of California, Los Angeles faculty